Borsuk (the word for "badger" in a number of Slavic languages) may refer to:

Angela Borsuk (born 1967), Israeli chess player
Karol Borsuk, Polish mathematician
Borsuk, Hrubieszów County in Lublin Voivodeship (east Poland)
Borsuk, Krasnystaw County in Lublin Voivodeship (east Poland)
Borsuk IFV, a Polish IFV made by Huta Stalowa Wola